Diamantina may refer to:

Geography

Australia 
 Diamantina Bowen (1833-1893), grande dame of Queensland and the wife of Sir George Bowen, the first Governor of Queensland.
 Diamantina Cocktail, 1976 album by Little River Band
 Diamantina National Park, Queensland
 Diamantina River, a river in Queensland and South Australia
 HMAS Diamantina, two ships in the Royal Australian Navy
 Shire of Diamantina, a local government area in Queensland

Brazil
Chapada Diamantina, a region of Bahia state
Diamantina, Minas Gerais, a municipality and UNESCO World Heritage Site

Elsewhere 
 Diamantina Fracture Zone, Indian Ocean trench
 Diamantina Deep

Biology 
Diamantina (plant), a genus of plants in the family Podostemaceae

In fiction 
 Diamantina, a fictional island in the Indian Ocean, in the animated television series Noah's Island